A bus terminus is a designated place where a bus or coach starts or ends its scheduled route. The terminus is the designated place that a timetable is timed from. Termini can be located at bus stations, interchanges, bus garages or bus stops. Termini can both start and end at the same place, or may be in different locations for starting and finishing a route. Termini may or may not coincide with the use of bus stands.

Size of termini

For operational reasons and passenger routes to be their bus garage, where the legal terminus is just outside or nearby. For the purposes of integration of different public transport modes, termini may also be located as part of a transportation hub or 'interchange' or alongside other major amenities such as universities, shopping centres or hospitals. Minor termini may be a bus stop or loop in a residential street, used by very few or just one.

Operational considerations
While it may be of prime importance to the passenger, the location of a terminus may be made for reasons other than convenience of passengers.

Competitive interests
In rare cases, where the bus operator is commercially separate from the bus station owner, the bus company may choose to terminate services outside the station, so as not to incur usage fees. Additionally, counter to the idea of integration, competing bus operators may use different locations as intermediate termini, to discourage passengers use of competitors services.

Turning
A factor in the location of a terminus is how to turn the bus around to start the route in the other direction, which may be difficult in areas where road space is an issue, or the road layout prevents U-turns. This does not apply for true circle routes, where buses simply operate permanently in the clockwise or anti-clockwise direction. Termini in bus stations will often include reversing/run-around space, negating the turning issue.

Layover

Another consideration about the location of a terminus is the need to lay over before resuming in service.

In busy locations, such as main streets or bus stations, allowing the bus the space to lay over may not be appropriate, and the bus may have to run out of service, to a quieter layover point, before returning to the terminus to start the route again.

To allow layover at a terminus, many routes run through busy centres terminating either side in quiet termini, where a bus can lay over without causing an obstruction. In the one-stop case, this can cause problems for passengers when an apparently in-service bus parks at a bus stop with the doors closed, waiting until the timetabled departure time, or when an arriving bus is not forming a departing service. This can be mitigated by using a bus stand. In the two-stop type, the arrival stop can be used as the layover point.

Layover time is time built into a schedule between arrival at the end of a route and the departure for the return trip, used for the recovery of delays and preparation for the return trip.

Driver change
Terminus location may be positioned to allow driver changes, although this may be less of a factor than the location of the bus garage. Centrally located termini may be more convenient for driver changes. Some operators operate pool cars to allow drivers to drive to and wait at a quiet terminus, swapping the car with the bus when it arrives.

Types of terminus

One stop
Many routes avoid the need to accommodate turning by having the end of the route form a small circuit as an official part of the route. The terminus is designated as one stop on this circuit, with the bus starting and finishing in the same orientation. This is often necessary in many town centres with one-way traffic systems.

Space permitting, the terminus may be a purpose built run-around Bus turnout, which allows the bus to change direction simply by entering and leaving the turnout. Often the infrastructure for this remains from a previous tram or trolleybus system.

In rare cases, to allow a one stop terminus, routes may be arranged to start and finish at the same terminus, with buses arriving as one scheduled route, and leaving as a different route. This can also be done to allow a formal midpoint to split up a long route, reducing the knock-on effect of delays.

Two stop
As opposed to a one stop arrangement, some routes that need to reverse direction at a terminus will start and finish in different stops, and the pair of stops locations forms the terminus. This necessitates running the bus out of service along other streets in order to position in the bus for the reverse direction. In the UK, this is often achieved by locating the terminus near a roundabout.

In this case, the arrival point can be designated as a 'set down only' stop, where passengers are not permitted to board.

Route terminus variations

Often one bus route will follow a core main route, but towards the termini, the bus may branch off and terminate in different locations. This may be indicated by different route numbers, or with the same route number but a different destination name on the headsign/rollsign.

Routes may also have a number of different termini on the same numbered route, again shown only by different destinations. These may be used at different times according to operational need, usually to reflect different demand at the different times of the day.

See also

Bus station
Bus garage
Bus stop
Dead mileage
Train terminus
 Inter State Bus Terminals

References 

Bus terminology
Public transport
Bus stations